The Cello Concerto No. 3, Legend of the Phoenix, is a composition for cello solo and orchestra by the American composer Augusta Read Thomas.  The work was commissioned by the Boston Symphony Orchestra with contributions from Bill and Solange Brown.  It was first performed in Boston on March 14, 2013, by the cellist Lynn Harrell and the Boston Symphony Orchestra under the conductor Christoph Eschenbach.  Thomas subsequently adapted the piece into a viola concerto in 2013.

Composition
The concerto has a duration of roughly 26 minutes and is composed in a single continuous movement.  Thomas described the deliberately ambiguous title of the piece in an interview with The Boston Globe, remarking:

Instrumentation
The work is scored for solo cello and a large orchestra comprising piccolo, two flutes, oboe, cor anglais, two clarinets (doubling bass clarinet), bassoon, contrabassoon, two horns, three trumpets (doubling piccolo trumpet), trombone, bass trombone, four percussionists, harp, piano, and strings.

Reception
Reviewing the world premiere, Jeremy Eichler of The Boston Globe highly praised the concerto, writing:
He added, "The crowd's reception went well beyond the polite applause sometimes given to new scores."  David Wright of The Classical Review also lauded Thomas's "skillful scoring" and particularly complimented the orchestral writing, noting, "At times it seemed one was listening to a Concerto for Orchestra and Cello instead of the other way around."  He continued:

References

Compositions by Augusta Read Thomas
2012 compositions
Thomas 3
Music commissioned by the Boston Symphony Orchestra